Jeff Broin (born August 25, 1965) is the founder of POET, LLC, a leading producer of biofuels and coproducts. He currently serves as Chairman and CEO.

Life and career
Broin's family ran a farm in Minnesota. In the early 1980s, Broin's father began producing ethanol on the farm. In 1987, he mortgaged the farm to purchase an ethanol plant in Scotland, South Dakota, and put Jeff in charge of managing it. Jeff became the CEO of Broin Companies, and in 2007 renamed it to POET. It is now the world's largest biofuel producer, with 28 plants.

Broin advocates for the biofuels industry and also serves on the board of Growth Energy, the leading biofuel trade association in the country.

Awards and recognition

 2017 recipient of the George Washington Carver Award for Innovation in Industrial Biotechnology. This award honors and recognizes an individual who has made significant contributions to building a biobased economy by applying industrial biotechnology to create environmentally sustainable products.
 2017 inductee into the South Dakota Hall of Fame.
 2017 recipient of Honorary Doctorate of Public Service from South Dakota State University.
 Keynote speaker at the 2018 Biotech Innovation Showcase.
 Keynote speaker at the 2018 University of South Dakota Distinguished Speaker Series.
 Global Bioeconomy Leadership Award 
 Fortune "Change the World" List 
 Fast Company's 2019 "World's Most Innovative Companies" 
 2020 American Biofuels Visionary Award

Health and Wellness Initiatives 
POET places an emphasis on fitness and nutrition programs for its employees, offering exercise rooms, on-site health screenings, yearly blood and biometric screenings, and one-on-one health consultations.

Philanthropy 
Broin formed the POET Foundation, a non-profit that focuses on children and agriculture. Supported U.S. projects include Make-A-Wish, LifeLight, Children's Home Society, Global Health Ministries, 4-H, and FFA.

In 2011, he and his family founded the non-profit Seeds of Change. Current projects include Mission Greenfield, which spreads agriculture technology by working with 80,000 farmers in Kenya; Mission Greenhouse, a multi-year project to develop a school for disadvantaged girls in Kenya; Mission Breathe, a project focused in Kenya and Haiti to transition from solid cooking fuels (wood and charcoal) to liquid renewable biofuels; and projects such as potable water development, health, and nutrition education in Africa.

In 2019, Broin announced a $2 million gift for construction of the precision agriculture facility at South Dakota State University, citing SDSU's increasing commitment to precision agriculture as an important step toward combatting climate change.

Personal life 
Jeff Broin grew up near Kenyon, MN. He holds a degree in Agricultural Business from University of Wisconsin and is husband of over 27 years to his wife, Tammie, and father to three children - Alyssa, Miranda, and Austin.

Broin was behind his companies donation of $1,080,950 to Smart Growth Sioux Falls, in attempt to keep a pork processing facility from building with in the city limits of Sioux Falls SD.  Many of those hogs are fed with DDGs produced at POET facilities.

References

External links
[1] McElroy, Anduin Kirkbride (May 22, 2007) A Poetic Journey Ethanol Producer Magazine 
[2] Growth Energy Leadership and Board of Directors Retrieved Oct. 7, 2011
[3] Dolan, Kerry A. (Nov. 24, 2008) Mr. Ethanol Fights Back Forbes 
[4] ACORE Phase II of Renewable Energy in America National Policy Forum Speakers Retrieved Oct. 10, 2011
[5] Winchester, Cody (Sept. 26,2011) Poet hails $105 million loan guarantee Argus Leader
[6] POET (Sept. 23, 2011) DOE grants final approval on POET cellulosic ethanol loan guarantee Retrieved Oct. 10, 2011

1965 births
Living people
People from Sioux Falls, South Dakota
University of Wisconsin–River Falls alumni
American chief executives of energy companies
People from Kenyon, Minnesota